Gyamfi Kyeremeh (born 9 March 1995) is a Belgian football winger, who currently plays for Oldham Athletic A.F.C. in League One.

Career

Kyeremeh made his professional debut on 30 August 2014 in a Belgian Pro League match for Waasland-Beveren against Lierse S.K.

In 2015, he joined the reserve side of German club Eintracht Braunschweig in the Regionalliga Nord.

In August 2017, Kyeremeh signed a two-year deal with an option of a third at Oldham Athletic A.F.C. following a trial spell.

Career statistics

References

External links 
 
 

1995 births
Living people
Belgian footballers
Association football forwards
S.K. Beveren players
Eintracht Braunschweig II players
Oldham Athletic A.F.C. players
Belgian Pro League players
Regionalliga players
English Football League players
Belgian expatriate footballers
Expatriate footballers in Germany
Expatriate footballers in England